Elections to Ryedale District Council were held on 1 May 2003 in the United Kingdom.  The whole council was up for election with boundary changes since the last election in 1999 increasing the number of seats by 7. The council stayed under no overall control.

Election result

|}

1 Conservative candidate was unopposed.

Ward results

External links
2003 Ryedale election result
 Ryedale District Council Election 2003
Ward results

1999
2003 English local elections
2000s in North Yorkshire